The New Negro: The Life of Alain Locke is a 2018 biography of Alain LeRoy Locke written by historian Jeffrey C. Stewart. The biography examines the life of Locke, an African-American activist and scholar who mentored many African-American intellectuals and writers and whom many see as the "father" of the Harlem Renaissance. Published by Oxford University Press, The New Negro won the 2018 National Book Award for Nonfiction and the 2019 Pulitzer Prize for Biography.

Alain Locke 
Alain Locke was born in 1885 in Philadelphia and was exposed to the arts early in life. He was educated in a prominent school amongst white peers. He knew early in life that he was gay and the "friction" this caused amongst homophobic peers helped him both intellectually and creatively. Locke would go on to be the first African-American Rhodes scholar at Oxford before going on to Harvard to earn his PhD in philosophy. Locke would go on to mentor many African-American writers and intellectuals including: Langston Hughes, Cullen, Zora Neale Hurston, Claude McKay, Jean Toomer, Jacob Lawrence, and Eric Walrondand. Despite his contribution to African-American and American society his life and his work has largely been overlooked.

Content 
The biography derived its name from a 1925 anthology titled The New Negro: An Interpretation that featured many prominent African-American writers and came as a result of an essay written by Locke which focused on Harlem as the epicenter and "mecca" for black culture and creativity. The term "New Negro" came about during the Harlem Renaissance and stood for a person who was outspoken and who refused to accept Jim Crow laws and segregation. The 900 page biography explores Locke and the impact he made on the African-American intellectual and creative community from a variety of angles. Making use of primary sources of Locke's life as well as interviews with those who knew him, Stewart discusses Locke's education and his role as both a student and an educator. The biography then goes on to explore such themes as race, politics, economics as well the arts and how this all contributed to the Harlem renaissance. Locke's private life is discussed as well including his relationship to his family and being a gay man his long term search for a life partner.

Reception 
The New Negro received the 2018 National Book Award for Nonfiction, the 2019 Pulitzer Prize for Biography the Mark Lynton History Prize and the James A. Rawley Prize from the Organization of American Historians. It was nominated for the 2019 Randy Shilts Award and Lambda Literary Award.

References 

2018 non-fiction books
English-language books
National Book Award for Nonfiction winning works
Oxford University Press books
American biographies
Pulitzer Prize for Biography or Autobiography-winning works
Biographies about LGBT people
2010s LGBT literature